Chalakudi railway station (station code: CKI) is an important railway station between Irinjalakuda railway station and Divine Nagar railway station in the busy Shoranur–Cochin Harbour section in Thrissur district. Chalakudi railway station is operated by the Chennai-headquartered Southern Railways of the Indian Railways. It is an 'A' class station under Trivandrum division, and the second-largest station in Thrissur district after Thrissur railway station. It is also the first station declared as Adarsh station in Thrissur district.
 The nearest airport is Cochin International Airport which is 19 kilometers away from here.

Trains passing through Chalakudi railway station

References 

Thiruvananthapuram railway division
Railway stations in Thrissur district
Buildings and structures in Chalakudy